Paja is a Serbian masculine given name, a diminutive form of Pavle. Notable people with the name include:

 Paja Jovanović (1859–1957), Serbian painter
 Paja Dolezar (born 1944), Serbian football player and manager
 Paja Francuski (born 1949), Serbian politician

It was also the nom de guerre of Slobodan Bajić Paja (1916–1943).

See also
 Pajo (given name), a diminutive of Pavle/Pavao

Serbian masculine given names